Hosea 8 is the eighth chapter of the Book of Hosea in the Hebrew Bible or the Old Testament of the Christian Bible. This chapter contains the prophecies attributed to the prophet Hosea son of Beeri, about the impending destruction to Israel and Judah for their impiety and idolatry. It is a part of the Book of the Twelve Minor Prophets.

Text 
The original text was written in Hebrew language. This chapter is divided into 14 verses.

Textual witnesses
Some early manuscripts containing the text of this chapter in Hebrew are of the Masoretic Text tradition, which includes the Codex Cairensis (895), the Petersburg Codex of the Prophets (916), Aleppo Codex (10th century), Codex Leningradensis (1008). Fragments containing parts of this chapter in Hebrew were found among the Dead Sea Scrolls, including 4Q82 (4QXIIg; 25 BCE) with extant verse 1.

There is also a translation into Koine Greek known as the Septuagint, made in the last few centuries BCE. Extant ancient manuscripts of the Septuagint version include Codex Vaticanus (B; B; 4th century), Codex Alexandrinus (A; A; 5th century) and Codex Marchalianus (Q; Q; 6th century).

Verse 7
For they have sown the wind, and they shall reap the whirlwind:
it hath no stalk; the bud shall yield no meal: if so be it yield, the strangers shall swallow it up.
"For they have sown the wind, and they shall reap the whirlwind." This is considered a proverb which states that works have rewards and actions have consequences, especially that people may face negative consequences for their bad actions.<ref name=benson>Benson, Joseph. [http://biblehub.com/commentaries/benson/hosea/8.htm '’Commentary on the Old and New Testaments. Hosea 8.] Accessed 9 Juli 2019.</ref> "Reap the whirlwind" has been used as the title for several works of fiction.

Verse 9
 For they have gone up to Assyria, like a wild donkey alone by itself; Ephraim has hired lovers. "Gone up":  reflecting Israel's sunken state, and Assyria's superiority, because normally the foreigners were said to "go up" when they come to the land of Israel.
 "To Assyria": may refer to the request of Menahem for help from Pul, the king of Assyria, to put him on the throne (cf.). Menahem's name is found as a tributary to the Assyrian king in his 'eighth year' in inscriptions discovered in the southwest palace of Nimrod. The dynasty of Pul ('Phalluka') was supplanted by that of Tiglath-pileser III at Nineveh about 768 (or 760) BCE.
 "Wild ass": of the East or "pere", is "heady, unruly, undisciplinable" (cf. ; Abraham was told that Ishmael would be one in ), "obstinate, running with swiftness far outstripping the swiftest horse", without rule or direction. However, the one breaking away alone would expose itself for a prey to lions (cf. "the wild donkey is the lion's prey in the wilderness"; Ecclesiasticus 13:19). Israel had become "stubborn, heady, selfwilled, refusing to be ruled by God's law and His counsel", but instrad running to the Assyrian, then would perish there. This is a figure of Israel's headstrong perversity in following her own bent.
 "Hired lovers": or "sued for lovers", in contrast of being independent by going alone, Ephraim lost independence by soliciting help from foreign allies.

Verse 11
 Because Ephraim hath made many altars to sin, altars shall be unto him to sin.''
 "Many altars to sin": The altars were built not with an intention to commit sin, but to offer sacrifice for sin (make atonement for it). However, they are directed to idols, not the God of Israel, so the people sinned in making these and also caused sin for other people who followed their example. This refers to the action of king Jeroboam of Israel, who erected altars in Dan and Bethel, and caused the people to build the altars in all high places, and tops of mountains, where they sacrificed to idols, against the commandment of God, who required sacrifice only at one place, and on one altar.

See also

Related Bible parts: Hosea 6, Hosea 7

Notes

References

Sources

External links

Jewish
Hosea 8 Hebrew with Parallel English
Hosea 8 Hebrew with Rashi's Commentary

Christian
Hosea 8 English Translation with Parallel Latin Vulgate

08